Tang Chia-hung (born 23 September 1996) is a Taiwanese artistic gymnast. He won the gold medal in the horizontal bar and the silver medal in the floor exercise at the 2018 Asian Games held in Jakarta, Indonesia.

In 2017, he finished in 4th place in the men's floor event at the Summer Universiade held in Taipei, Taiwan. At the 2019 Summer Universiade in Naples, Italy, he won the gold medal in the horizontal bar event. He also won the silver medal in the men's team all-around event.

In 2019, at the World Artistic Gymnastics Championships in Stuttgart, Germany, he has qualified to represent Chinese Taipei at the 2020 Summer Olympics in Tokyo, Japan.

References

External links 
 

Living people
1996 births
Place of birth missing (living people)
Taiwanese male artistic gymnasts
Gymnasts at the 2014 Asian Games
Gymnasts at the 2018 Asian Games
Medalists at the 2018 Asian Games
Asian Games gold medalists for Chinese Taipei
Asian Games silver medalists for Chinese Taipei
Asian Games medalists in gymnastics
Universiade medalists in gymnastics
Universiade gold medalists for Chinese Taipei
Universiade silver medalists for Chinese Taipei
Competitors at the 2017 Summer Universiade
Medalists at the 2019 Summer Universiade
Gymnasts at the 2020 Summer Olympics
Olympic gymnasts of Taiwan
21st-century Taiwanese people